Thorius macdougalli, commonly known as MacDougall's pigmy salamander, is a species of salamander in the family Plethodontidae. It is endemic to Oaxaca, Mexico, and is known from Cerro de Humo (its type locality) and Sierra de Juárez. Its natural habitat is pine-oak forest, but it also occurs in degraded habitats. It is threatened by habitat loss caused by clear-cutting and livestock grazing.

References

Thorius
Endemic amphibians of Mexico
Fauna of the Sierra Madre de Oaxaca
Taxonomy articles created by Polbot
Amphibians described in 1949